Donald A. Koehler (September 1, 1925 – February 26, 1981) is one of 
He was generally recognized as the tallest living man in the world from at least 1969 until his death in 1981.

He was born in Denton, Montana, United States. Koehler and his twin sister were born to parents of taller than average height. He started an abnormal period of growth when he was 10 years old.

As a youth, he lived with his family on the north side of Chicago, attending Amundsen High School.

Koehler's wore shoes that were size 22, but he once stated that his most bothersome clothing problem was finding socks that fit him. He was later able to find a hosiery company in Pennsylvania that began custom-making socks for him.

Employment
For 25 years Koehler worked as a salesman for the Big Joe Manufacturing Company, retiring three years before his death. He considered his size to be an advantage, for potential customers would often want to meet with him out of curiosity, and they always remembered him.

Later life and death
Later in life, he suffered from the medical condition kyphosis, resulting in (often severe) curvature of the spine.
He was 55 years old.

Per Koehler's wishes, his body was cremated, and his ashes scattered on a lake in Wisconsin where he liked to fish.

References

External links
The Tallest Man: Don Koehler
Famous People Height List

1925 births
1981 deaths
People with gigantism
People from Fergus County, Montana
People from Chicago